Triteia was, in Greek mythology, the daughter of the sea-god Triton and mother, by Ares, of Melanippus who gave to a town in Achaea the name of his mother. Sacrifices were offered there to Ares and Tritaea in the temple of Athena.

Notes

References 

 Pausanias, Description of Greece with an English Translation by W.H.S. Jones, Litt.D., and H.A. Ormerod, M.A., in 4 Volumes. Cambridge, MA, Harvard University Press; London, William Heinemann Ltd. 1918. Online version at the Perseus Digital Library
 Pausanias, Graeciae Descriptio. 3 vols. Leipzig, Teubner. 1903.  Greek text available at the Perseus Digital Library.

Women of Ares
Women in Greek mythology
Triton (mythology)